The 2022 All-Ireland Junior Football Championship is the 90th staging of the All-Ireland Junior Football Championship since its establishment by the Gaelic Athletic Association in 1912. The championship is scheduled to run between 8 July 2022 and 10 July 2022.

Kerry were the defending champions, however, they did not field a team because of a change in championship format. 

The All-Ireland final was played on 10 July 2022 at Croke Park in Dublin, between Kilkenny and New York, in what was their first ever meeting in the final. Kilkenny won the match by 3-12 to 1-09 to claim their first ever championship title.

Kilkenny's Mick Kenny was the championship's top scorer with 2-08.

Format

After a two-year hiatus due to the COVID-19 pandemic, the All-Ireland Junior Championship returned with a new format confined to just four teams; New York, Kilkenny and the winner and runner-up of the British Junior Football Championship. Prior to the change, the championship previously featured a provincial structure for all junior Gaelic football inter-county teams in Ireland.

Teams

Results

Bracket

All-Ireland semi-finals

All-Ireland final

Championship statistics

Top scorers

Overall

In a single game

References

All-Ireland Football Football Championships
All-Ireland Junior Football Championship